Tim Bricheno (born Timothy John Bricheno, 6 July 1963, Huddersfield, Yorkshire) is an English guitarist, songwriter and music teacher. He was a member of several notable English indie bands, including All About Eve, The Sisters of Mercy, XC-NN (originally "CNN" until the band ran into legal problems with America's Cable News Network) and Tin Star. He has also played as a tour guest and recorded with The Mission.

Bricheno has written music under several pseudonyms for other recording artists including Dusty Springfield and Gene Pitney. He currently plays in 'Jok', a band formed with ex XC-NN, and former Tin Star vocalist, David Tomlinson. He moved into media composition during the late 1990s alongside brother Toby Bricheno.

Bricheno was listed as a songwriting tutor and course author at Middlesex University Hendon, ICMP (Institute of Contemporary Music) and the Academy of Contemporary Music in Guildford.

References

English rock guitarists
1963 births
Living people
The Sisters of Mercy members
Gothic rock musicians
Musicians from Huddersfield
All About Eve (band) members